Kashmiri Lal Zakir (7 April 1919 – 31 August 2016) was an Indian poet, novelist, dramatist and short story writer of Urdu literature.

His career—which started with his first ghazal published in Adabi Duniya, a publication from Lahore, in the 1940s—encompasses novels, dramas, short stories and travelogues.

Zakir served the Punjab Education Department in then British India and had been involved with Haryana Urdu Academy for a number of years as its chairman. He has written in Hindi and Urdu, including Tin cihre ek saval, a ghazal anthology, Ab Mujhey Sone Do, a novel and Aey Mao Behno Betiyo, a collection of articles.

Zakir is a recipient of the honour of Fakhr-e-Haryana from the Government of Haryana. The Government of India awarded him the fourth highest civilian honour of the Padma Shri, in 2006, for his contributions to Indian literature.

Zakir died on 31 August 2016 at the age of 97.

References 

1919 births
2016 deaths
Recipients of the Padma Shri in literature & education
Urdu-language poets from India
Indian male novelists
Indian male short story writers
Indian male essayists
Indian male poets
Indian male dramatists and playwrights
20th-century Indian poets
20th-century Indian novelists
20th-century Indian short story writers
20th-century Indian dramatists and playwrights
20th-century Indian essayists
21st-century Indian poets
21st-century Indian novelists
21st-century Indian short story writers
21st-century Indian dramatists and playwrights
21st-century Indian essayists
Novelists from Haryana
20th-century Indian male writers
21st-century Indian male writers
Dramatists and playwrights from Haryana
Poets from Haryana
Writers from Jammu and Kashmir
Novelists from Jammu and Kashmir
Poets from Jammu and Kashmir
Urdu-language travel writers
Indian travel writers
Writers from Chandigarh
People from Gujrat District